Roadstown is an unincorporated community located within Stow Creek Township, in Cumberland County, New Jersey, United States.

Demographics

History
Prior to the American Revolution, Roadstown was considered an important settlement in the region.  Roadstown was then known as "Sayre's Cross-Roads" or "Sayre's Corners", named for Ananias Sayre, "a leading citizen" and county sheriff. Maskell Ware settled in Roadstown in 1789, where he worked as a farmer and manufacturer of hand-made chairs.  Ware chairs are today considered collectors items.

The Cohansey Baptist Church relocated to Roadstown in 1802.  Established in 1683, it is today the third oldest Baptist church in New Jersey. A post office was established in 1803. In 1834, Roadstown had a tavern, two stores, 20 dwellings, and "was peopled principally by the cultivators of the soil".  By 1882, the population had grown to 200.

Notable people
 Harris Flanagin, 7th governor of Arkansas.
 Charles Elmer Hires, inventor of root beer and namesake of Hires Root Beer.  Lived in Roadstown as a child, and may have been born there.

References

Stow Creek Township, New Jersey
Unincorporated communities in Cumberland County, New Jersey
Unincorporated communities in New Jersey